Along with the notion of experience economy, employee experience is defined as a set of psychocognitive sentiments about the experiential benefits of employment. Employee experience is formed when an employee interacts with careers’ elements (e.g., firms, supervisors, coworkers, customer, environment, etc.) that affect his or her cognition and attitudes and leads to particular behaviors related to the employee's job and company.

Employee experience management (EEM or EXM) was conceptualized by Kaveh Abhari as an approach to deliver positive experiences to employees that leads to positive customer experience by emphasizing their experiential needs as does experiential marketing for external customers. EEM, in a similar manner as with internal marketing, is an internal approach focusing on employees (internal customers) prior to external customers.
EEM is based on the goal of creating a desirable customer experience whenever employees interact with customers or provide information and services to them. Utilizing employees in delivering brand-value promises is another concern. EEM goes beyond standard human-resource management by rewarding employee experience in the forms of both professional and personal development.

A global human-capital trends survey based on more than 7,000 responses in over 130 countries framed the shifting paradigm as: "After three years of struggling to drive employee engagement… Executives see a need to redesign the organization." In a July 2021 IDC survey, 85% of respondents reported that an improved employee experience and higher employee engagement translate to better customer experience, higher customer satisfaction, and higher revenues.

See also 

 Employee engagement
 Employee experience design
 Employee retention
 Total Experience

References

External links
Service Experience through Understanding Employee Experience

Human resource management
Strategic management